Neophrissoma is a genus of longhorn beetles of the subfamily Lamiinae, containing the following species:

 Neophrissoma rotundipenne Breuning, 1938
 Neophrissoma umbrinum (White, 1858)

References

Phrissomini